The 1928 Calgary municipal election was held on December 12, 1928 to elect a Commissioner and six Aldermen to sit on Calgary City Council. Along with positions on Calgary City Council, three trustees for the Public School Board, two trustees for the Separate School Board, and three questions put before the voters.

Calgary City Council governed under "Initiative, Referendum and Recall" which is composed of a Mayor, Commissioner and twelve Aldermen all elected to staggered two year terms. Mayor Frederick Ernest Osborne and six Aldermen: Frank Roy Freeze, Thomas Alexander Hornibrook, Frederick Charles Manning, Robert Henry Parkyn, Samuel Stanley Savage, and William Howell Arthur Thomas elected in 1927 continued in their positions.

Background
The election was held under the Single Transferable Voting/Proportional Representation (STV/PR) with the term for candidates being two years.

W.H. Green, a contractor running under the Civic Government Association banner was the only candidate for Council who had never ran for public office before.

Results

Commissioner

Council
Quota for election was 1,343.

Public School Board

Separate school board

Plebiscites

Storm sewer
Relief and storm sewers bylaw for $380,000. Approval requires two-thirds majority.
For - 4,109
Against - 1,149

Centre St. paving
Paving and widening of Centre Street North for $102,000. Approval requires two-thirds majority.
For - 3,804
Against - 1,440

Fire hall equipment
New equipment for the fire hall for $50,000. Approval requires two-thirds majority.
For - 3,692
Against - 1,518

See also
List of Calgary municipal elections

References

1920s in Calgary
Municipal elections in Calgary
1928 elections in Canada